"The Ordinary Women" is a poem from Wallace Stevens's first book of poetry, Harmonium.

Opinion is divided about whether the poem expresses Stevens' distaste for romanticism in art, a "mordant satire...of all the things that other poems hold sacred"; or whether the poem is about "the refreshment that art, in its palace, gives to reality".

In support of the ironic reading, the stanza that includes the inscrutable line "Ti-lill-o!" suggests insipid observers of vulgar soap-opera art. The surrounding stanzas find the women bathed in silly moonlight that "fubs the girandoles", leaning out from "the vapid haze of the window-bays", listening to a guitarist who drones on and on—the whole proceedings rendered "faintly or overtly repellent". Milton J. Bates speaks of the "Ti-lill-o" of titillation, the guitars as Hollywood fantasies, "beta b and gamma g" as a love scene between a boy and a girl, the women as leading humdrum and sexually unfulfilled lives.

Stevens' use of the verb "to fub" may be an interpretive choice-point. If that use isn't taken as ironically dismissing the romantic aura surrounding moonlight's effect on candelabras, there is an opening for the "refreshment of reality" reading favored by Buttel as well as Sukenick. "Presumably", Buttel writes, "the women, having read the 'heavenly script' in their visit to the palace of art, return to reality renewed, 'Puissant' of speech and filled with 'Insinuations  of desire'".

In 1982, Los Angeles art rock band The Fibonaccis recorded a spoken word rendition of "The Ordinary Women" set to music on their EP (fi'-bo-na'-chez).

Notes

References 

 Bates, Milton J. Wallace Stevens: A mythology of self. 1985: University of California Press.
 Buttel, Robert. "Teasing the reader into Harmonium.  The Wallace Stevens Journal. Volume VI, Numbers 3/4 (Fall 1982)
 Sukenick, Ronald. Wallace Stevens: musing the obscure. 1967: New York University Press.
 Vendler, Helen. Words Chosen Out Of Desire. 1984: University of Tennessee Press.

1922 poems
American poems
Poetry by Wallace Stevens